Vital Deykala (born 18 April 1984) is a Belarusian retired professional footballer.

External links
Profile at teams.by

1984 births
Living people
Belarusian footballers
FC Torpedo-BelAZ Zhodino players
FC Naftan Novopolotsk players
FC Neman Grodno players
FC Vitebsk players
Association football forwards